Bossa Nova is an album by Brazilian guitarist Bola Sete that was released in 1962 by Fantasy Records.

Release and reception 

Richie Unterberger of Allmusic gave the album four out of five stars, calling Sete's music "virtuosic, yet at the same time imbued with passion and taste."

In 2001, Bossa Nova was issued on CD with Tour de Force.

Track listing

Personnel 
 Bola Sete – guitar
 Ben Tucker – bass guitar
 Dave Bailey – drums

Release history

References

External links 
 

1962 albums
Bola Sete albums
Fantasy Records albums